The Angakuei community belong to the people (Angakueth- adjective) are members of the clan from Baidit Payam, Jonglei, South Sudan. The word Angakuei originates from the word Kuei, which means eagle. Abel Alier Kuai, was the first South Sudanese to become the first vice President of The Sudan and the first president of the High Executive Council of Southern Sudan, is from the Angakuei clan. Alier is a name originated from Angakueth the peoples of Angakuei. (The name originated from Alir-piou which means the peacefully heart). It is officially written as "Alier" .

See also
Culture of South Sudan
History of South Sudan
National Archives of South Sudan

References

Clans
Ethnic groups in South Sudan